Asociación Deportiva Orión is a Panamanian football team playing at the Liga Nacional de Ascenso. It is based in San Miguelito and it was founded in 1987.

History
Las aguilas naranjas played in ANAPROF around mids 1990's, but they were demoted and have not since moved from Primera A

Honours
Copa Rommel Fernández: 1
2001

Liga Nacional de Ascenso: 0
Runners-up (2): 2008, 2009

External links
Official website 

Football clubs in Panama
Association football clubs established in 1987
1987 establishments in Panama